Fourteen Hours is a 1951 American drama directed by Henry Hathaway, which tells the story of a New York City police officer trying to stop a despondent man from jumping to his death from the 15th floor of a hotel.

The film won critical acclaim for Richard Basehart, who portrayed the mentally disturbed man on the building ledge. Paul Douglas played the police officer, and a large supporting cast included Barbara Bel Geddes, Agnes Moorehead, Robert Keith, Debra Paget, and Howard Da Silva. It was the screen debut of Grace Kelly and Jeffrey Hunter, who appeared in small roles.

The screenplay was written by John Paxton, based on an article by Joel Sayre in The New Yorker describing the 1938 suicide of John William Warde.

Plot
Early one morning, a room-service waiter at a New York City hotel is horrified to discover that the young man to whom he has just delivered breakfast is standing on the narrow ledge outside his room on the 15th floor. Charlie Dunnigan, a policeman on traffic duty in the street below, tries to talk him off the ledge to no avail. He is ordered back to traffic patrol by NYPD emergency services deputy chief Moksar, but he is ordered to return when the man on the ledge will not speak to psychiatrists summoned to the scene. Coached by a psychiatrist, Dunnigan tries to relate to the man on the ledge as one human to another.

The police identify the man as Robert Cosick and locate his mother, but her overwrought, hysterical behavior only upsets Cosick and seems to drive him toward jumping. His father, whom he despises, arrives. The divorced father and mother clash over old family issues, and the conflict is played out in front of the police. Dunnigan seeks to reconcile Robert with his father, whom Cosick has been brought up to hate by his mother. Dunnigan forces Mrs. Cosick to reveal the identity of a "Virginia" mentioned by Robert, and she turns out to be his estranged fiancée.

While this is happening, a crowd is gathering below. Cab drivers are wagering on when he will jump. A young stock-room clerk named Danny is wooing a fellow office worker, Ruth, whom he meets by chance on the street. A woman is seen at a nearby law office, where she is about to sign the final papers for her divorce. Amid legal formalities, she watches the drama unfold. Moved by the tragic events, she decides to reconcile with her husband.

After a while, Dunnigan convinces Cosick everyone will leave the hotel room so that he can rest. As Cosick steps in, a crazy evangelist sneaks into the room and Cosick goes back to the ledge. This damages his trust in Dunnigan, as does an effort by police to drop down from the roof and grab him. As night falls, Virginia is brought to the room, and she pleads with Robert to come off the ledge, to no avail. All the while, the police, under the command of Moksar, are working to grab Robert and put a net below him.

Dunnigan seems to make a connection with Cosick when he talks about the good things in life, and he promises to take Cosick fishing for "floppers" on Sheepshead Bay. Cosick is about to come inside when a boy on the street accidentally turns on a spotlight that blinds Robert, and he falls from the ledge. He manages to grab a net that the police had stealthily put below him, and he is hauled into the hotel. Dunnigan is greeted by his wife and son, and Danny and Ruth walk the street hand in hand.

Cast

Production

Factual basis
Although the onscreen credits contain a statement saying that the film and characters depicted were "entirely fictional", the movie was based on the suicide of John William Warde, a 26-year-old man who jumped from the 17th floor of the Gotham Hotel in New York City on Tuesday, July 26, 1938, after 14 hours on a ledge. The character of Charlie Dunnigan was based on Charles V. Glasco, a New York City policeman who tried to convince Warde to come off the ledge.> In the film, however, various details about Officer Glasco's life were fictionalized.

Pretending to be a bellhop at the hotel, Glasco entered room 1714 and tried to persuade Warde that he would be fired as a bellboy if Warde did not come off the ledge. Glasco spoke with Warde on and off for 14 hours. Warde, who had made previous suicide attempts, also heard pleas from his sister. Glasco had convinced Warde to come back into the hotel, but a photographer attempting to photograph Warde scared him as he was re-entering the hotel. As a result, Warde then jumped off of the ledge at 10:38 p.m. Police had tried to rig a net below him, but the net could not be extended sufficiently from the hotel to block his fall. During his 14 hours on the ledge, traffic was stopped for blocks around the hotel, which was located on 55th Street and Fifth Avenue in Manhattan, and thousands watched the drama unfold.

Script
Writer Joel Sayre wrote about the Warde suicide in The New Yorker, in an article entitled "That Was New York: The Man on the Ledge", which was published on April 16, 1949. The story was purchased by Twentieth Century Fox in April 1949 and the studio assigned Sol C. Siegel to produce.

In August 1949, Fox said that the team of James Gow and Arnaud D'asseu, who had written the Broadway hit Tomorrow the World, would write the script. In January 1950, Fox assigned screenwriter John Paxton to write the script. Paxton completely fictionalised the story. He decided not to use flashbacks to explain why the lead character was up on the ledge. Richard Basehart, who eventually starred, said "Paxton decided against this easy explanation of action and treated his central character as a pebble thrown into a pool of water. Without losing sight of the pebble he concentrated on ripples it raised and wrote the dramatic vignettes and one act plays around the people they washed over."

Twentieth Century Fox changed the title from The Man on the Ledge to Fourteen Hours at the request of Warde's mother, so the picture would not be as closely identified with her son. The title was changed in April 1950.

Studio chief Darryl F. Zanuck considered changing the setting of the movie to another city for the same reason. But it was ultimately filmed in New York.

Director
Howard Hawks refused to direct this movie because of its subject matter. He was only interested in doing it if it could be turned into a Cary Grant comedy but Fox refused.

Henry Hathaway, a director noted for his realistic films The House on 92nd Street (1945), Kiss of Death (1947), and Call Northside 777 (1948), was assigned to the project in April 1950.

Cast notes
Sayre's story was originally purchased as a vehicle for Richard Widmark, who was to play the man on the ledge, with Robert Wagner to play the role of Danny, but was replaced by Jeffrey Hunter.

The role of the man on the ledge went to Richard Basehart, who had achieved stage fame in The Hasty Heart and had just signed a long-term contract with Fox.

As early as August 1949 Paul Douglas was announced for the role of the cop. In February 1950 Richard Widmark was mentioned as a possibility for the man. By April, Basehart and Douglas had firmed as the leads.

Grace Kelly made her film debut in Fourteen Hours, beating Anne Bancroft for the role. Her casting was announced in June 1950. She was best known at the time for playing The Father on stage.

Barbara Bel Geddes, who played Basehart's love interest, did not appear in another film until Vertigo, seven years later.

Hathaway hired over 300 actors to play bit parts and extras in the film, much of which was filmed on lower Broadway in Manhattan. Among actors performing in uncredited roles were Ossie Davis and Harvey Lembeck, playing taxi drivers, and Joyce Van Patten, Brad Dexter, who subsequently appeared in The Magnificent Seven (1960), John Cassavetes, and Robert Keith's 30-year-old son Brian Keith. Other uncredited and bit players included Richard Beymer, who played the lead in West Side Story a few years later, radio's Throckmorton P. Gildersleeve, Willard Waterman as a hotel clerk, future Broadway star Janice Rule, and character actors Leif Erickson and John Randolph.

Shooting
Filming began in New York City in June 1950.

The film was made in just six weeks with a modest budget. The New York exteriors were filmed at the American Exchange National Bank building, located at 128 Broadway in lower Manhattan, starting June 1950. The building has since been demolished.

Hathaway avoided stasis by cutting between the film ledge and the reaction of the crowd below, and by adroit use of camera angles. It is considered to be his finest film.

Basehart had to spend most of the film not moving. "I got so accustomed to this that I didn't feel the need for movement," he said. "I learned to feel movement by the turn of my head, the puff of a cigarette or the gesture of a hand."

His stand in on the ledge of 128 Broadway was Richard Lacovara. There was a padded platform below him; however this was removed for shooting some shots.

Even with the double, Basehart still had to endure over 300 hours of standing on the ledge with little movement during the 50 days of shooting in New York, even though he had a sprained ankle and his legs were ravaged by poison oak contracted on the grounds of his Coldwater Canyon home.

Basehart's wife, costume designer Stephanie Klein, was diagnosed with a brain tumor during filming of Fourteen Hours in May and June 1950, and died following brain surgery during production of the film that July. Returning to work, Basehart sprained an ankle, then contracted poison oak while cutting down a tree at home. He resumed filming with legs bandaged.

Postproduction
The film originally ended with Robert falling to his death. Both endings were shot, and Hathaway preferred the realistic ending that showed Robert falling to the ground, as occurred in the Warde incident. However, on 17 July 1950, Dionysia Skouras, the daughter of Fox president Spyros Skouras jumped to her death from the roof of the Fox West Coast Building. (She had recently spent time in a sanitarium.)

Skouras wanted the film shelved, but instead released Fourteen Hours six months later with the ending that showed Robert surviving his fall.

Reception

Critical response
The New Yorker singled out Basehart's performance for praise, saying that he "succeeds in conveying the notion that he is indeed sorely beset."

The New York Times film critic, Bosley Crowther, praised the "gripping suspense, absorbing drama and stinging social comment in this film." Crowther said: "Fitly directed by Henry Hathaway in a crisp journalistic style and played to the hilt down to its 'bit' parts, it makes a show of accelerating power." Crowther praised Basehart's "startling and poignant" performance, and said that Douglas "takes the honors as the good-natured cop who finds all his modest resources of intelligence and patience taxed by this queer case." He also praised Da Silva, Moorehead, and the other supporting players for bringing "personality and credibility to this superior American film."

Time Out Film Guide said that this "vertiginous melodrama recounts the event in professional low-key journalistic fashion." Comparing the movie to the film noir Ace in the Hole, Time Out observed that "the emphasis is as much on the reaction of bystanders as on the plight of the would-be suicide."

Accolades
The film was nominated for an Academy Award for Best Art Direction (Lyle R. Wheeler, Leland Fuller, Thomas Little, Fred J. Rode).

Fourteen Hours was listed as among the top-10 motion pictures of 1951 by the National Board of Review of Motion Pictures. For his performance in the movie, Basehart won the 1951 award for best actor by the board.

The film also was nominated for the BAFTA award for best film from any source. Hathaway was nominated for the Golden Lion Award at the Venice Film Festival, and Paxton was nominated for a Writers Guild of America award for his screenplay.

Legacy
Despite good reviews and a strong push by the studio to publicize the movie, with Paul Douglas appearing on the cover of Life, Fourteen Hours ran its course in cinemas then faded into obscurity, rarely if ever appearing on American television in the 1950s or 1960s. When the film was shown in revival at a Los Angeles theater in 2003, only one print survived. However, the title was included in Twentieth Century Fox's "Fox Film Noir" DVD series in 2006.

Writing in Dark City: The Lost World of Film Noir, author Eddie Muller wrote: "It's a tense depiction of one man's personal despair, amid the teeming concrete indifference of the modern city."

Kelly was noticed during a visit to the set by Gary Cooper, who subsequently starred with her in High Noon. Cooper was charmed by Kelly and said that she was "different from all these sexballs we've been seeing so much of." However, her performance in Fourteen Hours was not noticed by critics, and did not lead to her receiving other film acting roles. She returned to television and stage work after her performance in the film.

Richard Basehart's performance impressed Federico Fellini, who subsequently cast him in his 1954 film La Strada.

Man on the Ledge
In 1955, it was remade as Man on the Ledge, starring Cameron Mitchell, as an episode of The 20th Century Fox Hour.

The episode was released theatrically in Britain.

Cast
Cameron Mitchell
Joseph Cotten

Production
Steve Fisher wrote the script. Filming took place in November 1955.

References

External links
 
 Man on the Ledge at BFI
 
 
 Fourteen Hours review at DVD Beaver
 
 

1951 films
1951 drama films
20th Century Fox films
American drama films
American black-and-white films
1950s English-language films
Fictional portrayals of the New York City Police Department
Films about the New York City Police Department
Film noir
Films scored by Alfred Newman
Films about suicide
Films directed by Henry Hathaway
Films set in hotels
Films set in New York City
Films produced by Sol C. Siegel
1950s American films